Rajgarh State (Hindi Name: राजगढ़) was a princely state in India, named after its capital Rajgarh, Madhya Pradesh. It was part of the colonial Bhopal Agency of the Central India Agency during the British Raj. It lay in the region of Malwa known as Umatwara after the ruling Umat clan, a branch of the Parmar Rajputs. The neighbouring Narsinghgarh State was ruled by a cadet branch of this family, after being partitioned in 1681.

Rajgarh had an area of 2,492 Square Kilometers (940 sq. miles) and a population of 88,376 in 1901. Estimated revenue, 33,000 rupees (1911); tribute (to Sindhia of Gwalior) 3,640. The state revenue reached Rs.450,000 in 1901, the privy purse was Rs.140,000 rupees. Grain and opium were the principal articles of trade.

History 
The Umats of Rajgarh claim descent from the medieval Paramara dynasty that ruled over Malwa for some 600 years. The Umats were driven out of Sindh by the Samma dynasty during the 14th century; Samma sources assign this event to either 1334 or 1351 CE, while the Umats assign it to 1347. Upon being expelled from Sindh, the Umats migrated to Malwa under the leadership of one Sarangsen, who then acquired land in the area between the Sindh and Parbati rivers. This area would come to be known as Umatwara after the Umats.

Sarangsen is said to have later received the title of Rawat by the Rana of Chittor. His descendants were held in high regard by the Delhi Sultans; Rawat Karam Singh, 4th in descent from Sarangsen, is said to have been made governor of Ujjain under Sikandar Lodi. Karam Singh received a sanad for 22 districts in Umatwara, and he made his capital at Duparia, near Shajapur. 

A later descendant, Rawat Krishnaji or Kishen Singh, was also governor of Ujjain, and the Kishenpura quarter of Ujjain was supposedly named after him. He died in 1583 and was succeeded by his son Dungar Singh, who founded the town of Dungarpur near Rajgarh and made it his capital. Dungar Singh had six sons, with the two oldest being Udaji and Dudaji. After Dungar Singh was killed at Talen in 1603, Udaji inherited the estate and was recognised as the rightful heir in a sanad granted by Akbar. He moved the capital to Ratanpur and ruled until 1621.

Udaji's successor, Chhatar Singh, died in battle in 1638 and was succeeded by his son Mohan Singh. As Mohan Singh was still a minor at the time, the diwan Ajab Singh, a descendant of Dudaji who had served as a minister of Chhatar Singh, was made regent of the Umatwara estate. The capital was moved back to Dungarpur for the duration of Ajab Singh's regency, and the town of Rajgarh was founded in 1640. After Ajab Singh died in battle at Nalkhera in 1668, his son Paras Ram succeeded as manager of the estate. At this point, Mohan Singh moved his capital to Rajgarh, while Paras Ram moved his capital to Patan, just south of Rajgarh, where he built a fort.

The division of Umatwara into Rajgarh and Narsinghgarh States took place in 1681. An initial division of villages had been made in 1675, leading to a sort of dual jurisdiction between Mohan Singh and Paras Ram that proved to be unmanageable. Thus, a formal division of the Umatwara territory into two states was made in 1681, with the ruler of Rajgarh (Mohan Singh) receiving five extra villages in recognition of his seniority. The daughter Mrinalini fled to the Himalayas and named her new seat (in present Himachal Pradesh) Rajgarh as well.

In 1855, Rajgarh State contributed Rs. 25,000 towards the construction of the parts of the Agra-Bombay road that were within its borders.

After India's independence in 1947, the last ruling Raja acceded to the Indian government on 15 June 1948. Rajgarh became part of Madhya Bharat state, which was formed out of the western half of the Raj's Central India Agency of princely states. In 1956 Madhya Bharat was merged into Madhya Pradesh state.

Geography 
The southern and eastern parts of Rajgarh State lay on the Malwa plateau, while the northern part was very hilly. The northern hills were Vindhyan sandstone, while the rest of the state was part of the Deccan Traps. This area has a mostly temperate climate, with more variation in temperature in the hills. The main rivers traversing the former state's territory are the Parbati, on the eastern border, and its tributary the Newaj.

Around the turn of the 20th century, 214,900 acres of Rajgarh State were covered by forests, about half of which were in the pargana of Biaora. These forests consisted of decidious trees interspersed with patches of bamboo. Common trees included the karrai (Sterculia urens), Bombax malabaricum, Butea frondosa, Buchanania cochinchinensis, dhaora (Anogeissus latifolia), and Diospyros tomentosa.

Animal species native to the area of Rajgarh State include various types of deer, leopard, and wild boar.

Economy 
The main exports of Rajgarh State around the turn of the 20th century were grain, crude opium (chik), ghee, poppy seeds, and tilli, while the major imports included piece goods, silk, salt, sugar, kerosene oil, rice and other grains, and hardware. No opium was produced in the state; all crude opium grown locally was collected by the state darbar and then exported. The main manufactured goods produced were khadi cloth, blankets, and ghee; there was also a cotton mill at Biaora which employed 26 people and produced 5,000 maunds of cotton cloth annually.

Rajgarh State had no mines, although two sandstone quarries existed, one at Silapati and the other at Kotda. A majority of the population was engaged in agriculture, with the 1901 census recording 60% of the population engaged in agricultural work.

The main centres of trade were Rajgarh and Biaora, and to a lesser extent the other pargana headquarters. Rajgarh and Biaora also hosted large cattle fairs. The major merchant groups were the Banias (Hindu and Jain), dealing in food, opium, and piece goods; and the Bohoras (Muslim), dealing mainly in hardware. The main trade routes were by road to Guna, Sehore, and Indore, where goods were then transported by rail.

Rajgarh State never minted its own currency. Instead, coins produced by Bhopal State and other princely states were in use until 1897, when the British rupee was declared the sole legal tender.

Administration 
The monarch of Rajgarh State held absolute authority in matters of governance. He generally delegated executive authority to a diwan, who was responsible for the day-to-day administration of the state's various departments (Darbar, Revenue, Judicial, Public Works, Police, Educational, and Medical).

Rajgarh State was divided into seven parganas: Newalganj, Biaora, Kalipith, Karanwas, Kotra, Sheogarh, and Talen. Each pargana was overseen by a tahsildar, who served as the chief revenue officer and also presided over the lowest level of criminal courts in the state.

At the turn of the 20th century, the state maintained a small army of 30 cavalry, 102 infantry, and 7 artillery with 4 guns. The annual military budget was Rs. 20,000.

A police force was established in 1902, consisting of 309 constables under the direction of a Muntazim, who was in turn assisted by an Assistant Muntazim, 5 inspectors, and 13 sub-inspectors. The police force was distributed among 11 thanas.

Rulers 
Its heads of the state used the titles Rawat (title) (equivalent to Raja) until 1872 and after one Nawab (Raja Moti Singh converted to Islam) 1880 again; and from 1886 Raja.

Umat 
 1638 – 14 April 1714 Mohan Singh  (d. 1714)
 1714? – 1740 Amar Singh
 1740 – 1747 Narpat Singh 
 1747 – 1775 Jagat Singh 
 1775 – 1790 Hamir Singh 
 1790 – 1803 Pratap Singh 
 1803 – 1815 Prithvi Singh 
 1815 – 1831 Newal Singh            (d. 1831) 
 1831 – 1872 Rawat Moti Singh       (b. 1814 – d. 1880)  see below 
 1846 – November 1847 Thakur Khok Singh – administrator

Nawab 
 1872 – October 1880 Mohammad 'Abd al-Wasih Khan  (s.a.) (previously Rawat as Rawat Moti Singh)

Rawats 
 1880 – 1882 Bakhtawar Singh               (d. 1882) 
 6 July 1882 – 1 January 1886 Balbhadra Singh  (b. 1857 – d. 1902)  (see below)

Rajas 
 1 January 1886 – January 1902 Balbhadra Singh    (s.a.) 
 20 January 1902 – 9 January 1916 Bane Singh      (b. 1857 – d. 1916) (from 1 January 1908, Sir Bane Singh)
20 August 1908 – 21 November 1940 Ram Singh     (Section in Himachal Pradesh)
 17 January 1916 – 26 October 1936 Birendra Singh (b. 1878 – d. 1936) (from 1 January 1918, Sir Birendra Singh)
 18 December 1936 – 15 August 1947 Bikramaditya Singh (b. 1936)
21 November 1940 – 15 August 1947 Ram Charan Singh  (Section- Himachal)

See also 
 Political integration of India

References 

Rajgarh, Madhya Pradesh
Princely states of Madhya Pradesh
Rajput princely states
Salute states
15th-century establishments in India
1948 disestablishments in India